Singing Behind Screens is a 2003  Italian adventure-drama film written and directed by Ermanno Olmi, loosely inspired to real life events of Chinese pirate Ching Shih. The film won three David di Donatello and four Nastro d'Argento Awards.

Plot

Cast  
Jun Ichikawa as Widow Ching
Bud Spencer as Old Captain Andorrano
Sally Ming Zeo Ni as Confident 
Camillo Grassi as Nostromo
Makoto Kobayashi as  Admiral Ching

See also      
 List of Italian films of 2003

References

External links

2003 films
Films directed by Ermanno Olmi
Italian adventure drama films
2000s adventure drama films
Pirate films
Italian biographical drama films
Films produced by Tom Rosenberg
Films shot in Montenegro
2003 biographical drama films
2003 drama films
2000s Italian films